Ki Kore Bojhabo ... Tomake is a Bengali romantic thriller film directed by Chaya Singh. 
It stars Arjun Chakraborty, Chaya Singh, Tanveer Khan, Riwk, Payal and Jai Badlani. The film produced under the banner of Theatrical Definitions premiered on 13 April 2012.

Plot
Vikram, a poor man, falls in love with Sapna, seeing her innocence, her humanity and her charisma but hell breaks loose on him when he realises she is married. The first impulse is wrath, hatred and accusations of being cheated but then love overpowers everything and his love for her grows. Vikram learns of Sapna's misery, all thanks to her mentally sick and physically disabled husband Bissonath who has reached this state following an accident. Bissonath also has a sister called Aparna whom he loves very much and she too has a boyfriend Uday. Both Bissonath and Aparna leave no opportunity to disgrace and insult Sapna. Now Vikram's only aim in life is to take Sapna out of that hell and bring to her life all the happiness in the world.

Cast
 Arjun Chakraborty as Bisshonath
 Chaya Singh as Sapna
 Joy Badlani
 Tanveer Khan as Vikram
 Riwk as Uday
 Payal Karak as Aparna
 Jai Badlani
 Aashique
 Rajat

Music
The music of the film is composed by Ashok Bhadra and the lyrics are written by Usman Ghani. The music was released by VENUS on 4 April 2012. The films songs are:

References

2012 films
Bengali-language Indian films
2010s Bengali-language films
2012 directorial debut films